Chuck Compton (born January 13, 1965 in Atwater, California.) was an American professional football player in the National Football League.

Career
Compton played with the Green Bay Packers during the 1987 NFL season. He played at the collegiate level at Boise State University.

See also
List of Green Bay Packers players

References

1965 births
People from Atwater, California
Green Bay Packers players
American football defensive backs
Boise State University alumni
Boise State Broncos football players
Living people
Players of American football from California